Hussein Tahan (born 10 March 1982) is a Lebanese football coach and former player who is the head coach of  club Bourj.

International career
Tahan played for Lebanon in a friendly in 2003 against Bahrain.

Managerial career 
Tahan was appointed assistant coach of Bourj in November 2020. He was appointed head coach in January 2023.

Personal life 
His brother, Mohamad Zein Tahan, was also an international footballer for Lebanon.

Honours
Bourj
 Lebanese Second Division: 2000–01

Safa
 Lebanese Elite Cup: 2009
 AFC Cup runner-up: 2008
 Lebanese FA Cup runner-up: 2007–08, 2010–11

Racing Beirut
 Lebanese Challenge Cup: 2016, 2017

See also
 List of association football families

References

External links
 
 
 

1982 births
Living people
Association football forwards
Lebanese footballers
Bourj FC players
Safa SC players
Akhaa Ahli Aley FC players
Sagesse SC footballers
Racing Club Beirut players
Lebanese Premier League players
Lebanon international footballers
Lebanese Second Division players
Association football coaches
Lebanese football managers
Bourj FC managers
Lebanese Premier League managers